Georgios Saramantas (born 29 January 1992) is a Greek professional footballer who plays as a left back for Super League club Lamia.

Career

Paniliakos
Saramantas moved to Paniliakos in the summer of 2012 from Xenofon Krestena. He debuted for Paniliakos in a match against Kalamata. He stayed with his hometown club for two seasons appearing in 37 matches.

Iraklis
On 10 July 2014 Saramantas signed for Greek Football League club Iraklis. He debuted for Iraklis in a cup match against Lamia. His league debut came a couple of months later against Olympiacos Volou. After the expiry of his contract he left the club. During his three seasons with the club he made a total of 91 appearances.

Panionios
On 15 June 2017, Saramantas signed a three years' contract with Super League club Panionios for an undisclosed fee.

Lamia
On 6 August 2020, Saramantas signed a one-year contract with Lamia.

Career statistics

References

External links
 
Myplayer.gr profile

1992 births
Living people
Super League Greece players
Football League (Greece) players
Paniliakos F.C. players
Iraklis Thessaloniki F.C. players
Panionios F.C. players
PAS Lamia 1964 players
Greek footballers
Association football fullbacks
Footballers from Pyrgos, Elis